Pêro de Alenquer was a 15th-century Portuguese explorer of the African coast. 

Pêro was born in Alenquer.  

He accompanied Bartolomeu Dias on his journey around the Cape of Good Hope in 1487/1488. He was the pilot of Vasco da Gama's flagship on the latter's first voyage to India and later wrote of it.

References

Portuguese explorers
Maritime history of Portugal
15th-century explorers of Africa
15th-century Portuguese people
People from Alenquer